"Migraine" is a Tagalog-language song written by Herbert Hernandez for the Filipino rock band Moonstar88, with Maychelle Baay in the lead vocals. It was released in early February 19, 2008 as the third single of their album Todo Combo (2007), after "Tadhana" and "Di Kasi". It was included in the soundtrack to the 2009 film When I Met U, and was later covered by actress Yassi Pressman for the 2018 film Pambansang Third Wheel and by Sue Ramirez for the 2019 film Cuddle Weather. Alongside "Torete" and "Sulat", "Migraine" is generally considered as one of Moonstar88's most popular songs.

In December 2012, Moonstar88 released an acoustic version of "Migraine" on their album This Year.

Music video
The song's music video was released in 2008.

References

2007 songs
2008 singles
Philippine rock songs
Sony Music singles
Tagalog-language songs